This article describes the syntax of the C# programming language. The features described are compatible with .NET Framework and Mono.

Basics

Identifier
An identifier is the name of an element in the code. It can contain letters, digits and underscores (_), and is case sensitive (FOO is different from foo). The language imposes the following restrictions on identifier names:
 They cannot start with a digit;
 They cannot start with a symbol, unless it is a keyword;
 They cannot contain more than 511 characters.

Identifier names may be prefixed by an at sign (@), but this is insignificant; @name is the same identifier as name.

Microsoft has published naming conventions for identifiers in C#, which recommends the use of PascalCase for the names of types and most type members, and CamelCase for variables and for private or internal fields. However, these naming conventions are not enforced in the language.

Keywords

Keywords are predefined reserved words with special syntactic meaning. The language has two types of keyword — contextual and reserved. The reserved keywords such as false or byte may only be used as keywords. The contextual keywords such as where or from are only treated as keywords in certain situations. If an identifier is needed which would be the same as a reserved keyword, it may be prefixed by an at sign to distinguish it. For example, @out is interpreted as an identifier, whereas out as a keyword. This syntax facilitates reuse of .NET code written in other languages.

The following C# keywords are reserved words:

 abstract
 as
 base
 bool
 break
 byte
 case
 catch
 char
 checked
 class
 const
 continue
 decimal
 default
 delegate
 do
 double
 else
 enum
 event
 explicit
 extern
 false
 finally
 fixed
 float
 for
 foreach
 goto
 if
 implicit
 in
 int
 interface
 internal
 is
 lock
 long
 namespace
 new
 null
 object
 operator
 out
 override
 params
 private
 protected
 public
 readonly
 ref
 return
 sbyte
 sealed
 short
 sizeof
 stackalloc
 static
 string
 struct
 switch
 this
 throw
 true
 try
 typeof
 uint
 ulong
 unchecked
 unsafe
 ushort
 using
 virtual
 void
 volatile
 while

A contextual keyword is used to provide a specific meaning in the code, but it is not a reserved word in C#. Some contextual keywords, such as partial and where, have special meanings in multiple contexts. The following C# keywords are contextual:

 add
 and
 alias
 ascending
 args
 async
 await
 by
 descending
 dynamic
 equals
 from
 get
 global
 group
 init
 into
 join
 let
 managed
 nameof
 nint
 not
 notnull
 nuint
 on
 or
 orderby
 partial
 record
 remove
 required
 select
 set
 unmanaged
 value
 var
 when
 where
 with
 yield

Literals

Digit separators 
Starting in C# 7.0, the underscore symbol can be used to separate digits in number values for readability purposes. The compiler ignores these underscores.
int bin = 0b1101_0010_1011_0100;
int hex = 0x2F_BB_4A_F1;
int dec = 1_000_500_954;
double real = 1_500.200_2e-1_000;
Generally, it may be put only between digit characters. It cannot be put at the beginning or the end of the value ( or ), next to the decimal in floating point values, next to the exponent character, or next to the type specifier.

Variables
Variables are identifiers associated with values. They are declared by writing the variable's type and name, and are optionally initialized in the same statement.

Declare
int myInt;         // Declaring an uninitialized variable called 'myInt', of type 'int'

Assigning
int myInt;        // Declaring an uninitialized variable
myInt = 35;       // Assigning the variable a value

Initialize
int myInt = 35;   // Declaring and initializing the variable

Multiple variables of the same type can be declared and initialized in one statement.
int a, b;         // Declaring multiple variables of the same type

int a = 2, b = 3; // Declaring and initializing multiple variables of the same type

Local variable type inference
This is a feature of C# 3.0.

C# 3.0 introduced type inference, allowing the type specifier of a variable declaration to be replaced by the keyword var, if its actual type can be statically determined from the initializer. This reduces repetition, especially for types with multiple generic type-parameters, and adheres more closely to the DRY principle.
var myChars = new char[] {'A', 'Ö'}; // or char[] myChars = new char[] {'A', 'Ö'};

var myNums = new List<int>();  // or List<int> myNums = new List<int>();

Constants
Constants are immutable values.

const
When declaring a local variable or a field with the const keyword as a prefix the value must be given when it is declared. After that it is locked and cannot change. They can either be declared in the context as a field or a local variable. Constants are implicitly static.
const double PI = 3.14;

This shows both uses of the keyword.
public class Foo
{
    private const double X = 3;

    public Foo()
    {
        const int y = 2;
    }
}

readonly
The readonly keyword does a similar thing to fields. Like fields marked as const they cannot change once initialized. The difference is that you can choose to initialize them in a constructor, or to a value that is not known until run-time. This only works on fields. readonly fields can either be members of an instance or static class members.

Code blocks
Curly braces  are used to signify a code block and a new scope. Class members and the body of a method are examples of what can live inside these braces in various contexts.

Inside of method bodies you can use the braces to create new scopes like so:
void DoSomething()
{
    int a;

    {
        int b;
        a = 1;
    }

    a = 2;
    b = 3; // Will fail because the variable is declared in an inner scope.
}

Program structure
A C# application consists of classes and their members. Classes and other types exist in namespaces but can also be nested inside other classes.

Main method
Whether it is a console or a graphical interface application, the program must have an entry point of some sort. The entry point of the C# application is the method called Main. There can only be one, and it is a static method in a class. The method usually returns void and is passed command-line arguments as an array of strings.
static void Main(string[] args)
{
}
// OR Main method can be defined without parameters.
static void Main()
{
}

The main method is also allowed to return an integer value if specified.
static int Main(string[] args)
{
    return 0;
}

Async Main 
This is a feature of C# 7.1.

Asynchronous Tasks can be awaited in the Main method by declaring it to return type Task. static async Task Main(string[] args)
{
    await DoWorkAsync(42);
}All the combinations of Task, or Task<int>, and with, or without, the string[] args parameter are supported.

Top-level statements 
This is a feature of C# 9.0.

Similar to in scripting languages, top-level statements removes the ceremony of having to declare the Program class with a Main method.  

Instead, statements can be written directly in one specific file, and that file will be the entry point of the program. Code in other files will still have to be defined in classes.  

This was introduced to make C# less verbose, and thus more accessible for beginners to get started.using System;

Console.WriteLine("Hello World!");Types are declared after the statements, and will be automatically available from the statements above them.

Namespaces
Namespaces are a part of a type name and they are used to group and/or distinguish named entities from other ones.
System.IO.DirectoryInfo // DirectoryInfo is in the System.IO-namespace
A namespace is defined like this:
namespace FooNamespace
{
    // Members
}

using directive
The using directive loads a specific namespace from a referenced assembly. It is usually placed in the top (or header) of a code file but it can be placed elsewhere if wanted, e.g. inside classes.
using System;
using System.Collections;

The directive can also be used to define another name for an existing namespace or type. This is sometimes useful when names are too long and less readable.
using Net = System.Net;
using DirInfo = System.IO.DirectoryInfo;

directive 
The  directive loads the static members of a specified type into the current scope, making them accessible directly by the name of the member.using static System.Console;

WriteLine("Hello, World!");

Operators

Operator overloading
Some of the existing operators can be overloaded by writing an overload method.
public static Foo operator+(Foo foo, Bar bar)
{
    return new Foo(foo.Value + bar.Value);
}

These are the overloadable operators:

Assignment operators ( etc.) are combinations of a binary operator and the assignment operator and will be evaluated using the ordinary operators, which can be overloaded.
Cast operators cannot be overloaded, but you can define conversion operators.
Array indexing operator is not overloadable, but you can define new indexers.

Conversion operators
The cast operator is not overloadable but you can write a conversion operator method which lives in the target class. Conversion methods can define two varieties of operators, implicit and explicit conversion operators. The implicit operator will cast without specifying with the cast operator and the explicit operator requires it to be used.

Implicit conversion operator
class Foo
{
    public int Value;

    public static implicit operator Foo(int value)
    {
        return new Foo(value);
    }
}
// Implicit conversion
Foo foo = 2;

Explicit conversion operator
class Foo
{
    public int Value;

    public static explicit operator Foo(int value)
    {
        return new Foo(value);
    }
}
// Explicit conversion
Foo foo = (Foo)2;

as operator
The as operator will attempt to do a silent cast to a given type. It will return the object as the new type if possible, and otherwise will return null.
Stream stream = File.Open(@"C:\Temp\data.dat");
FileStream fstream = stream as FileStream; // Will return an object.

String str = stream as String; // Will return null.

Null coalesce operator
This is a feature of C# 2.0.
The following:
return ifNotNullValue ?? otherwiseValue;
is shorthand for:
return ifNotNullValue != null ? ifNotNullValue : otherwiseValue;
Meaning that if the content of variable  is not null, that content will be returned, otherwise the content of variable  is returned.

C# 8.0 introduces null-coalescing assignment, such that
variable ??= otherwiseValue;
is equivalent to
if (variable is null) variable = otherwiseValue;

Control structures
C# inherits most of the control structures of C/C++ and also adds new ones like the foreach statement.

Conditional structures
These structures control the flow of the program through given conditions.

if statement
The if statement is entered when the given condition is true. Single-line case statements do not require block braces although it is mostly preferred by convention.

Simple one-line statement:
if (i == 3) ... ;

Multi-line with else-block (without any braces):
if (i == 2)
    ...
else
    ...

Recommended coding conventions for an if-statement.
if (i == 3)
{
    ...
}
else if (i == 2)
{
    ...
}
else
{
    ...
}

switch statement
The switch construct serves as a filter for different values. Each value leads to a "case". It is not allowed to fall through case sections and therefore the keyword break is typically used to end a case. An unconditional return in a case section can also be used to end a case. See also how goto statement can be used to fall through from one case to the next. Many cases may lead to the same code though. The default case handles all the other cases not handled by the construct.
switch (ch)
{
    case 'A':
        statement;
        ...
        break;
    case 'B':
        statement;
        break;
    case 'C': // A switch section can have multiple case labels.
    case 'D':
        ...
        break;
    default:
        ...
        break;
}

Iteration structures
Iteration statements are statements that are repeatedly executed when a given condition is evaluated as true.

while loop
while (i == true)
{
    ...
}

do ... while loop
do
{

}
while (i == true);

for loop
The for loop consists of three parts: declaration, condition and counter expression. Any of them can be left out as they are optional.
for (int i = 0; i < 10; i++)
{
    ...
}

Is equivalent to this code represented with a while statement, except here the  variable is not local to the loop.
int i = 0;
while (i < 10)
{
    //...
    i++;
}

foreach loop
The foreach statement is derived from the for statement and makes use of a certain pattern described in C#'s language specification in order to obtain and use an enumerator of elements to iterate over.

Each item in the given collection will be returned and reachable in the context of the code block. When the block has been executed the next item will be returned until there are no items remaining.
foreach (int i in intList)
{
    ...
}

Jump statements
Jump statements are inherited from C/C++ and ultimately assembly languages through it. They simply represent the jump-instructions of an assembly language that controls the flow of a program.

Labels and goto statement
Labels are given points in code that can be jumped to by using the goto statement.
start:
    .......
    goto start;
Note that the label need not be positioned after the goto statement; it may be before it in the source file.

The goto statement can be used in switch statements to jump from one case to another or to fall through from one case to the next.
switch (n)
{
    case 1:
        Console.WriteLine("Case 1");
        break;
    case 2:
        Console.WriteLine("Case 2");
        goto case 1;
    case 3:
        Console.WriteLine("Case 3");
    case 4: // Compilation will fail here as cases cannot fall through in C#.
        Console.WriteLine("Case 4");
        goto default; // This is the correct way to fall through to the next case.
    case 5:  // Multiple labels for the same code are OK
    case 6:
    default:
        Console.WriteLine("Default");
        break;  // Even default must not reach the end point
}

break statement
The break statement breaks out of the closest loop or switch statement. Execution continues in the statement after the terminated statement, if any.
int e = 10;
for (int i = 0; i < e; i++)
{
    while (true)
    {
        break;
    }
    // Will break to this point.
}

continue statement
The continue statement discontinues the current iteration of the current control statement and begins the next iteration.
int ch;
while ((ch = Console.Read()) != -1)
{
   	if (ch == ' ')
      		continue;    // Skips the rest of the while-loop

   	// Rest of the while-loop
   	...
}

The while loop in the code above reads characters by calling , skipping the statements in the body of the loop if the characters are spaces.

Exception handling
Runtime exception handling method in C# is inherited from Java and C++.

The base class library has a class called  from which all other exception classes are derived. An -object contains all the information about a specific exception and also the inner exceptions that were caused.
Programmers may define their own exceptions by deriving from the  class.

An exception can be thrown this way:
throw new NotImplementedException();

statements
Exceptions are managed within  blocks.
try
{
    // Statements which may throw exceptions
    ...
}
catch (Exception ex)
{
    // Exception caught and handled here
    ...
}
finally
{
    // Statements always executed after the try/catch blocks
    ...
}

The statements within the try block are executed, and if any of them throws an exception, execution of the block is discontinued and the exception is handled by the catch block. There may be multiple catch blocks, in which case the first block with an exception variable whose type matches the type of the thrown exception is executed.

If no catch block matches the type of the thrown exception, the execution of the outer block (or method) containing the try ... catch statement is discontinued, and the exception is passed up and outside the containing block or method. The exception is propagated upwards through the call stack until a matching catch block is found within one of the currently active methods. If the exception propagates all the way up to the top-most  method without a matching catch block being found, the entire program is terminated and a textual description of the exception is written to the standard output stream.

The statements within the finally block are always executed after the try and catch blocks, whether or not an exception was thrown. Such blocks are useful for providing clean-up code.

Either a catch block, a finally block, or both, must follow the try block.

Types
C# is a statically typed language like C and C++. That means that every variable and constant gets a fixed type when it is being declared. There are two kinds of types: value types and reference types.

Value types
Instances of value types reside on the stack, i.e. they are bound to their variables. If you declare a variable for a value type the memory gets allocated directly. If the variable gets out of scope the object is destroyed with it.

Structures
Structures are more commonly known as structs. Structs are user-defined value types that are declared using the struct keyword. They are very similar to classes but are more suitable for lightweight types. Some important syntactical differences between a class and a struct are presented later in this article. 
struct Foo
{
    ...
}

The primitive data types are all structs.

Pre-defined types
These are the primitive datatypes.

Note:  is not a struct and is not a primitive type.

Enumerations
Enumerated types (declared with enum) are named values representing integer values.
enum Season
{
    Winter = 0,
    Spring = 1,
    Summer = 2,
    Autumn = 3,
    Fall = Autumn    // Autumn is called Fall in American English.
}

Enum variables are initialized by default to zero. They can be assigned or initialized to the named values defined by the enumeration type.
Season season;
season = Season.Spring;

Enum type variables are integer values. Addition and subtraction between variables of the same type is allowed without any specific cast but multiplication and division is somewhat more risky and requires an explicit cast. Casts are also required for converting enum variables to and from integer types. However, the cast will not throw an exception if the value is not specified by the type definition.
season = (Season)2;  // cast 2 to an enum-value of type Season.
season = season + 1; // Adds 1 to the value.
season = season + season2; // Adding the values of two enum variables.
int value = (int)season; // Casting enum-value to integer value.

season++; // Season.Spring (1) becomes Season.Summer (2).
season--; // Season.Summer (2) becomes Season.Spring (1).

Values can be combined using the bitwise-OR operator .
Color myColors = Color.Green | Color.Yellow | Color.Blue;

Reference types
Variables created for reference types are typed managed references. When the constructor is called, an object is created on the heap and a reference is assigned to the variable. When a variable of an object goes out of scope the reference is broken and when there are no references left the object gets marked as garbage. The garbage collector will then soon collect and destroy it.

A reference variable is null when it does not reference any object.

Arrays
An array type is a reference type that refers to a space containing one or more elements of a certain type. All array types derive from a common base class, . Each element is referenced by its index just like in C++ and Java.

An array in C# is what would be called a dynamic array in C++.
int[] numbers = new int[2];
numbers[0] = 2;
numbers[1] = 5;
int x = numbers[0];

Initializers
Array initializers provide convenient syntax for initialization of arrays.
// Long syntax
int[] numbers = new int[5]{ 20, 1, 42, 15, 34 };
// Short syntax
int[] numbers2 = { 20, 1, 42, 15, 34 };
// Inferred syntax
var numbers3 = new[] { 20, 1, 42, 15, 34 };

Multi-dimensional arrays
Arrays can have more than one dimension, for example 2 dimensions to represent a grid.
int[,] numbers = new int[3, 3];
numbers[1,2] = 2;

int[,] numbers2 = new int[3, 3] { {2, 3, 2}, {1, 2, 6}, {2, 4, 5} };

See also
 Jagged array

Classes
Classes are self-describing user-defined reference types. Essentially all types in the .NET Framework are classes, including structs and enums, that are compiler generated classes. Class members are private by default, but can be declared as public to be visible outside of the class or protected to be visible by any descendants of the class.

Strings
The  class, or simply , represents an immutable sequence of unicode characters.

Actions performed on a string will always return a new string.
string text = "Hello World!";
string substr = text.Substring(0, 5);
string[] parts = text.Split(new char[]{ ' ' });

The  class can be used when a mutable "string" is wanted.
var sb = new StringBuilder();
sb.Append('H');
sb.Append("el");
sb.AppendLine("lo!");

Interface
Interfaces are data structures that contain member definitions with no actual implementation. A variable of an interface type is a reference to an instance of a class which implements this interface. See #Interfaces.

Delegates

C# provides type-safe object-oriented function pointers in the form of delegates.
class Program
{
    // Delegate type:
    delegate int Operation(int a, int b);

    static int Add(int i1, int i2)
    {
        return i1 + i2;
    }

    static int Sub(int i1, int i2)
    {
        return i1 - i2;
    }

    static void Main()
    {
        // Instantiate the delegate and assign the method to it.
        Operation op = Add;

        // Call the method that the delegate points to.
        int result1 = op(2, 3);  // 5

        op = Sub;
        int result2 = op(10, 2); // 8
    }
}

Initializing the delegate with an anonymous method.
addition = delegate(int a, int b) { return a + b; };
Initializing the delegate with lambda expression.
addition = (a, b) => a + b;

Events
Events are pointers that can point to multiple methods. More exactly they bind method pointers to one identifier. This can therefore be seen as an extension to delegates. They are typically used as triggers in UI development. The form used in C# and the rest of the Common Language Infrastructure is based on that in the classic Visual Basic.
delegate void MouseEventHandler(object sender, MouseEventArgs e);

public class Button : System.Windows.Controls.Control
{
    private event MouseEventHandler _onClick;

    /* Imaginary trigger function */
    void Click()
    {
        _onClick(this, new MouseEventArgs(data));
    }
}

An event requires an accompanied event handler that is made from a special delegate that in a platform specific library like in Windows Presentation Foundation and Windows Forms usually takes two parameters: sender and the event arguments. The type of the event argument-object derive from the EventArgs class that is a part of the CLI base library.

Once declared in its class the only way of invoking the event is from inside of the owner. A listener method may be implemented outside to be triggered when the event is fired.
public class MainWindow : System.Windows.Controls.Window
{
    private Button _button1;

    public MainWindow()
    {
        _button1 = new Button();
        _button1.Text = "Click me!";

        /* Subscribe to the event */
        _button1.ClickEvent += Button1_OnClick;

        /* Alternate syntax that is considered old:
        _button1.MouseClick += new MouseEventHandler(Button1_OnClick); */
    }

    protected void Button1_OnClick(object sender, MouseEventArgs e)
    {
        MessageBox.Show("Clicked!");
    }
}

Custom event implementation is also possible:
	private EventHandler _clickHandles = (s, e) => { };

	public event EventHandler Click
	{
		add
		{
			// Some code to run when handler is added...
			...

			_clickHandles += value;
		}
		remove
		{
			// Some code to run when handler is removed...
			...

			_clickHandles -= value;
		}
	}

See also
 Event-driven programming

Nullable types
This is a feature of C# 2.0.

Nullable types were introduced in C# 2.0 firstly to enable value types to be null (useful when working with a database).
int? n = 2;
n = null;

Console.WriteLine(n.HasValue);

In reality this is the same as using the  struct.
Nullable<int> n = 2;
n = null;

Console.WriteLine(n.HasValue);

Pointers
C# has and allows pointers to selected types (some primitives, enums, strings, pointers, and even arrays and structs if they contain only types that can be pointed) in unsafe context: methods and codeblock marked unsafe. These are syntactically the same as pointers in C and C++. However, runtime-checking is disabled inside unsafe blocks.
static void Main(string[] args)
{
    unsafe
    {
        int a = 2;
        int* b = &a;

        Console.WriteLine("Address of a: {0}. Value: {1}", (int)&a, a);
        Console.WriteLine("Address of b: {0}. Value: {1}. Value of *b: {2}", (int)&b, (int)b, *b);

        // Will output something like:
        // Address of a: 71953600. Value: 2
        // Address of b: 71953596. Value: 71953600. Value of *b: 2
    }
}

Structs are required only to be pure structs with no members of a managed reference type, e.g. a string or any other class.
public struct MyStruct
{
    public char Character;
    public int Integer;
}

public struct MyContainerStruct
{
    public byte Byte;
    public MyStruct MyStruct;
}

In use:
MyContainerStruct x;
MyContainerStruct* ptr = &x;

byte value = ptr->Byte;

Dynamic
This is a feature of C# 4.0 and .NET Framework 4.0.
Type dynamic is a feature that enables dynamic runtime lookup to C# in a static manner. Dynamic denotes a variable with an object with a type that is resolved at runtime, as opposed to compile-time, as normally is done.

This feature takes advantage of the Dynamic Language Runtime (DLR) and has been designed specifically with the goal of interoperation with dynamically typed languages like IronPython and IronRuby (Implementations of Python and Ruby for .NET).

Dynamic-support also eases interoperation with COM objects.
dynamic x = new Foo();
x.DoSomething();  // Will compile and resolved at runtime. An exception will be thrown if invalid.

Anonymous types
This is a feature of C# 3.0.
Anonymous types are nameless classes that are generated by the compiler. They are only consumable and yet very useful in a scenario like where you have a LINQ query which returns an object on select and you just want to return some specific values. Then you can define an anonymous type containing auto-generated read-only fields for the values.

When instantiating another anonymous type declaration with the same signature the type is automatically inferred by the compiler.
var carl = new { Name = "Carl", Age = 35 }; // Name of the type is only known by the compiler.
var mary = new { Name = "Mary", Age = 22 }; // Same type as the expression above

Boxing and unboxing
Boxing is the operation of converting a value of a value type into a value of a corresponding reference type.  Boxing in C# is implicit.

Unboxing is the operation of converting a value of a reference type (previously boxed) into a value of a value type. Unboxing in C# requires an explicit type cast.

Example:
int foo = 42;         // Value type.
object bar = foo;     // foo is boxed to bar.
int foo2 = (int)bar;  // Unboxed back to value type.

Object-oriented programming (OOP)
C# has direct support for object-oriented programming.

Objects
An object is created with the type as a template and is called an instance of that particular type.

In C#, objects are either references or values. No further syntactical distinction is made between those in code.

Object class
All types, even value types in their boxed form, implicitly inherit from the  class, the ultimate base class of all objects. This class contains the most common methods shared by all objects. Some of these are virtual and can be overridden.

Classes inherit  either directly or indirectly through another base class.

Members
Some of the members of the Object class:

  - Supports comparisons between objects.
  - Performs cleanup operations before an object is automatically reclaimed. (Default destructor)
  - Gets the number corresponding to the value of the object to support the use of a hash table.
  - Gets the Type of the current instance.
  - Creates a human-readable text string that describes an instance of the class. Usually it returns the name of the type.

Classes
Classes are fundamentals of an object-oriented language such as C#. They serve as a template for objects. They contain members that store and manipulate data in a real-life like way.

Differences between classes and structs
Although classes and structures are similar in both the way they are declared and how they are used, there are some significant differences. Classes are reference types and structs are value types. A structure is allocated on the stack when it is declared and the variable is bound to its address. It directly contains the value. Classes are different because the memory is allocated as objects on the heap. Variables are rather managed pointers on the stack which point to the objects. They are references.

Structures require some more work than classes. For example, you need to explicitly create a default constructor which takes no arguments to initialize the struct and its members. The compiler will create a default one for classes. All fields and properties of a struct must have been initialized before an instance is created. Structs do not have finalizers and cannot inherit from another class like classes do. Structs are more suitable for smaller constructs of data.

This is a short summary of the differences:

Declaration
A class is declared like this:
class Foo
{
    // Member declarations
}

Partial class
This is a feature of C# 2.0.

A partial class is a class declaration whose code is divided into separate files. The different parts of a partial class must be marked with keyword partial.
// File1.cs
partial class Foo
{
    ...
}

// File2.cs
partial class Foo
{
    ...
}

Initialization
Before you can use the members of the class you need to initialize the variable with a reference to an object. To create it you call the appropriate constructor using the new keyword. It has the same name as the class.
var foo = new Foo();

For structs it is optional to explicitly call a constructor because the default one is called automatically. You just need to declare it and it gets initialized with standard values.

Object initializers
This is a feature of C# 3.0.
Provides a more convenient way of initializing public fields and properties of an object. Constructor calls are optional when there is a default constructor.
var person = new Person
{
    Name = "John Doe",
    Age = 39
};

// Equal to
var person = new Person();
person.Name = "John Doe";
person.Age = 39;

Collection initializers
This is a feature of C# 3.0.
Collection initializers give an array-like syntax for initializing collections. The compiler will simply generate calls to the Add-method. This works for classes that implement the interface .
var list = new List<int> {2, 5, 6, 6};

// Equal to
var list = new List<int>();
list.Add(2);
list.Add(5);
list.Add(6);
list.Add(6);

Accessing members
Members of an instance and static members of a class are accessed using the  operator.

Accessing an instance member
Instance members can be accessed through the name of a variable.
string foo = "Hello";
string fooUpper = foo.ToUpper();

Accessing a static class member
Static members are accessed by using the name of the class or other type.
int r = string.Compare(foo, fooUpper);

Accessing a member through a pointer
In unsafe code, members of a value (struct type) referenced by a pointer are accessed with the  operator just like in C and C++.
POINT p;
p.X = 2;
p.Y = 6;
POINT* ptr = &p;
ptr->Y = 4;

Modifiers
Modifiers are keywords used to modify declarations of types and type members. Most notably there is a sub-group containing the access modifiers.

Class modifiers
abstract - Specifies that a class only serves as a base class. It must be implemented in an inheriting class.
sealed - Specifies that a class cannot be inherited.

Class member modifiers
const - Specifies that a variable is a constant value that has to be initialized when it gets declared.
event - Declares an event.
extern - Specifies that a method signature without a body uses a DLL-import.
override - Specifies that a method or property declaration is an override of a virtual member or an implementation of a member of an abstract class.
readonly - Declares a field that can only be assigned values as part of the declaration or in a constructor in the same class.
unsafe - Specifies an unsafe context, which allows the use of pointers.
virtual - Specifies that a method or property declaration can be overridden by a derived class.
volatile - Specifies a field which may be modified by an external process and prevents an optimizing compiler from modifying the use of the field.

static modifier
The static modifier states that a member belongs to the class and not to a specific object. Classes marked static are only allowed to contain static members. Static members are sometimes referred to as class members since they apply to the class as a whole and not to its instances.
public class Foo
{
    public static void Something()
    {
        ...
    }
}
// Calling the class method.
Foo.Something();

Access modifiers
The access modifiers, or inheritance modifiers, set the accessibility of classes, methods, and other members. Something marked  can be reached from anywhere.  members can only be accessed from inside of the class they are declared in and will be hidden when inherited. Members with the  modifier will be , but accessible when inherited.  classes and members will only be accessible from the inside of the declaring assembly.

Classes and structs are implicitly  and members are implicitly  if they do not have an access modifier.
public class Foo
{
    public int Do()
    {
        return 0;
    }

    public class Bar
    {

    }
}

This table defines where the access modifiers can be used.

Constructors
A constructor is a special method that is called automatically when an object is created. Its purpose is to initialize the members of the object. Constructors have the same name as the class and do not return anything. They may take parameters like any other method.
class Foo
{
    Foo()
    {
        ...
    }
}

Constructors can be public, private, protected or internal.

Destructor
The destructor is called when the object is being collected by the garbage collector to perform some manual clean-up. There is a default destructor method called  that can be overridden by declaring your own.

The syntax is similar to the one of constructors. The difference is that the name is preceded by a ~ and it cannot contain any parameters. There cannot be more than one destructor.
class Foo
{
    ...

    ~Foo()
    {
        ...
    }
}

Finalizers are always private.

Methods
Like in C and C++ there are functions that group reusable code. The main difference is that functions, just like in Java, have to reside inside of a class. A function is therefore called a method. A method has a return value, a name and usually some parameters initialized when it is called with some arguments. It can either belong to an instance of a class or be a static member.
class Foo
{
    int Bar(int a, int b)
    {
        return a%b;
    }
}

A method is called using  notation on a specific variable, or as in the case of static methods, the name of a type.
Foo foo = new Foo();
int r = foo.Bar(7, 2);

Console.WriteLine(r);

ref and out parameters
One can explicitly make arguments be passed by reference when calling a method with parameters preceded by keywords ref or out. These managed pointers come in handy when passing variables that you want to be modified inside the method by reference. The main difference between the two is that an out parameter must have been assigned within the method by the time the method returns, while ref need not assign a value.
void PassRef(ref int x)
{
    if (x == 2)
        x = 10;
}
int Z;
PassRef(ref Z);

void PassOut(out int x)
{
    x = 2;
}
int Q;
PassOut(out Q);

Optional parameters
This is a feature of C# 4.0.
C# 4.0 introduces optional parameters with default values as seen in C++. For example:
void Increment(ref int x, int dx = 1)
{
    x += dx;
}

int x = 0;
Increment(ref x);    // dx takes the default value of 1
Increment(ref x, 2); // dx takes the value 2

In addition, to complement optional parameters, it is possible to explicitly specify parameter names in method calls, allowing to selectively pass any given subset of optional parameters for a method. The only restriction is that named parameters must be placed after the unnamed parameters. Parameter names can be specified for both optional and required parameters, and can be used to improve readability or arbitrarily reorder arguments in a call. For example:
Stream OpenFile(string name, FileMode mode = FileMode.Open,
FileAccess access = FileAccess.Read) { ... }

OpenFile("file.txt"); // use default values for both "mode" and "access"
OpenFile("file.txt", mode: FileMode.Create); // use default value for "access"
OpenFile("file.txt", access: FileAccess.Read); // use default value for "mode"
OpenFile(name: "file.txt", access: FileAccess.Read, mode: FileMode.Create);
// name all parameters for extra readability,
// and use order different from method declaration

Optional parameters make interoperating with COM easier. Previously, C# had to pass in every parameter in the method of the COM component, even those that are optional. For example:
object fileName = "Test.docx";
object missing = System.Reflection.Missing.Value;

doc.SaveAs(ref fileName,
    ref missing, ref missing, ref missing,
    ref missing, ref missing, ref missing,
    ref missing, ref missing, ref missing,
    ref missing, ref missing, ref missing,
    ref missing, ref missing, ref missing);
console.writeline("File saved successfully");

With support for optional parameters, the code can be shortened as
doc.SaveAs(ref fileName);

extern
A feature of C# is the ability to call native code. A method signature is simply declared without a body and is marked as extern. The  attribute also needs to be added to reference the desired DLL file.
[DllImport("win32.dll")]
static extern double Pow(double a, double b);

Fields
Fields, or class variables, can be declared inside the class body to store data.
class Foo
{
    double foo;
}

Fields can be initialized directly when declared (unless declared in struct).
class Foo
{
    double foo = 2.3;
}

Modifiers for fields:
const - Makes the field a constant.
private - Makes the field private (default).
protected - Makes the field protected.
public - Makes the field public.
readonly - Allows the field to be initialized only once in a constructor.
static - Makes the field a static member.

Properties
Properties bring field-like syntax and combine them with the power of methods. A property can have two accessors: get and set.
public class Person
{
    private string _name;

    string Name
    {
        get { return _name; }
        set { _name = value; }
    }
}

// Using a property
var person = new Person();
person.Name = "Robert";

Modifiers for properties:
private - Makes the property private (default).
protected - Makes the property protected.
public - Makes the property public.
static - Makes the property a static member.

Modifiers for property accessors:
private - Makes the accessor private.
protected - Makes the accessor protected.
public - Makes the accessor public.

The default modifiers for the accessors are inherited from the property. Note that the accessor's modifiers can only be equal or more restrictive than the property's modifier.

Automatic properties
This is a feature of C# 3.0.
A feature of C# 3.0 is auto-implemented properties. You define accessors without bodies and the compiler will generate a backing field and the necessary code for the accessors.
public double Width { get; private set; }

Indexers
Indexers add array-like indexing capabilities to objects. They are implemented in a way similar to properties.
internal class IntList
{
    private int[] _items;

    int this[int index]
    {
        get { return _items[index]; }
        set { _items[index] = value; }
    }
}

// Using an indexer
var list = new IntList();
list[2] = 2;

Inheritance
Classes in C# may only inherit from one class. A class may derive from any class that is not marked as sealed.
class A
{
}

class B : A
{

}

virtual
Methods marked virtual provide an implementation, but they can be overridden by the inheritors by using the override keyword.

The implementation is chosen by the actual type of the object and not the type of the variable.
class Operation
{
    public virtual int Do()
    {
        return 0;
    }
}

class NewOperation : Operation
{
    public override int Do()
    {
        return 1;
    }
}

new
When overloading a non-virtual method with another signature, the keyword new may be used. The used method will be chosen by the type of the variable instead of the actual type of the object.
class Operation
{
    public int Do()
    {
        return 0;
    }
}

class NewOperation : Operation
{
    public new double Do()
    {
        return 4.0;
    }
}

This demonstrates the case:
var operation = new NewOperation();

// Will call "double Do()" in NewOperation
double d = operation.Do();

Operation operation_ = operation;

// Will call "int Do()" in Operation
int i = operation_.Do();

abstract
Abstract classes are classes that only serve as templates and you can not initialize an object of that type. Otherwise it is just like an ordinary class.

There may be abstract members too. Abstract members are members of abstract classes that do not have any implementation. They must be overridden by the class that inherits the member.
abstract class Mammal
{
    public abstract void Walk();
}

class Human : Mammal
{
    public override void Walk()
    {

    }

    ...
}

sealed
The sealed modifier can be combined with the others as an optional modifier for classes to make them uninheritable.
internal sealed class Foo
{

}

Interfaces
Interfaces are data structures that contain member definitions and not actual implementation. They are useful when you want to define a contract between members in different types that have different implementations. You can declare definitions for methods, properties, and indexers. Interface members are implicitly public. An interface can either be implicitly or explicitly implemented.
interface IBinaryOperation
{
    double A { get; set; }
    double B { get; set; }

    double GetResult();
}

Implementing an interface
An interface is implemented by a class or extended by another interface in the same way you derive a class from another class using the  notation.

Implicit implementation

When implicitly implementing an interface the members of the interface have to be public.
public class Adder : IBinaryOperation
{
    public double A { get; set; }
    public double B { get; set; }

    public double GetResult()
    {
        return A + B;
    }
}

public class Multiplier : IBinaryOperation
{
    public double A { get; set; }
    public double B { get; set; }

    public double GetResult()
    {
        return A * B;
    }
}

In use:
IBinaryOperation op = null;
double result;

// Adder implements the interface IBinaryOperation.

op = new Adder();
op.A = 2;
op.B = 3;

result = op.GetResult(); // 5

// Multiplier also implements the interface.

op = new Multiplier();
op.A = 5;
op.B = 4;

result = op.GetResult(); // 20

Explicit implementation

You can also explicitly implement members. The members of the interface that are explicitly implemented by a class are accessible only when the object is handled as the interface type.
public class Adder : IBinaryOperation
{
    double IBinaryOperation.A { get; set; }
    double IBinaryOperation.B { get; set; }

    double IBinaryOperation.GetResult()
    {
        return ((IBinaryOperation)this).A + ((IBinaryOperation)this).B;
    }
}

In use:
Adder add = new Adder();

// These members are not accessible:
// add.A = 2;
// add.B = 3;
// double result = add.GetResult();

// Cast to the interface type to access them:
IBinaryOperation add2 = add;
add2.A = 2;
add2.B = 3;

double result = add2.GetResult();

Note: The properties in the class that extends  are auto-implemented by the compiler and a backing field is automatically added (see #Automatic properties).

Extending multiple interfaces

Interfaces and classes are allowed to extend multiple interfaces.
class MyClass : IInterfaceA, IInterfaceB
{
    ...
}

Here is an interface that extends two interfaces.
interface IInterfaceC : IInterfaceA, IInterfaceB
{
    ...
}

Interfaces vs. abstract classes
Interfaces and abstract classes are similar. The following describes some important differences:
 An abstract class may have member variables as well as non-abstract methods or properties. An interface cannot.
 A class or abstract class can only inherit from one class or abstract class.
 A class or abstract class may implement one or more interfaces.
 An interface can only extend other interfaces.
 An abstract class may have non-public methods and properties (also abstract ones). An interface can only have public members.
 An abstract class may have constants, static methods and static members. An interface cannot.
 An abstract class may have constructors. An interface cannot.

Generics
This is a feature of C# 2.0 and .NET Framework 2.0.

Generics (or parameterized types, parametric polymorphism) use type parameters, which make it possible to design classes and methods that do not specify the type used until the class or method is instantiated. The main advantage is that one can use generic type parameters to create classes and methods that can be used without incurring the cost of runtime casts or boxing operations, as shown here:

// Declare the generic class.

public class GenericList<T>
{
    void Add(T input) { }
}

class TestGenericList
{
    private class ExampleClass { }
    static void Main()
    {
        // Declare a list of type int.
        var list1 = new GenericList<int>();

        // Declare a list of type string.
        var list2 = new GenericList<string>();

        // Declare a list of type ExampleClass.
        var list3 = new GenericList<ExampleClass>();
    }
}
When compared with C++ templates, C# generics can provide enhanced safety, but also have somewhat limited capabilities. For example, it is not possible to call arithmetic operators on a C# generic type. Unlike C++ templates, .NET parameterized types are instantiated at runtime rather than by the compiler; hence they can be cross-language whereas C++ templates cannot. They support some features not supported directly by C++ templates such as type constraints on generic parameters by use of interfaces. On the other hand, C# does not support non-type generic parameters.

Unlike generics in Java, .NET generics use reification to make parameterized types first-class objects in the Common Language Infrastructure (CLI) Virtual Machine, which allows for optimizations and preservation of the type information.

Using generics

Generic classes
Classes and structs can be generic.
public class List<T>
{
    ...
    public void Add(T item)
    {
         ...
    }
}

var list = new List<int>();
list.Add(6);
list.Add(2);

Generic interfaces
interface IEnumerable<T>
{
    ...
}

Generic delegates
delegate R Func<T1, T2, R>(T1 a1, T2 a2);

Generic methods
public static T[] CombineArrays<T>(T[] a, T[] b)
{
    T[] newArray = new T[a.Length + b.Length];
    a.CopyTo(newArray, 0);
    b.CopyTo(newArray, a.Length);
    return newArray;
}

string[] a = new string[] { "a", "b", "c" };
string[] b = new string[] { "1", "2", "3" };
string[] c = CombineArrays(a, b);

double[] da = new double[] { 1.2, 2.17, 3.141592 };
double[] db = new double[] { 4.44, 5.6, 6.02 };
double[] dc = CombineArrays(da, db);

// c is a string array containing { "a", "b", "c", "1", "2", "3"}
// dc is a double array containing { 1.2, 2.17, 3.141592, 4.44, 5.6, 6.02}

Type-parameters
Type-parameters are names used in place of concrete types when defining a new generic. They may be associated with classes or methods by placing the type parameter in angle brackets . When instantiating (or calling) a generic, you can then substitute a concrete type for the type-parameter you gave in its declaration. Type parameters may be constrained by use of the where keyword and a constraint specification, any of the six comma separated constraints may be used:

Covariance and contravariance
This is a feature of C# 4.0 and .NET Framework 4.0.

Generic interfaces and delegates can have their type parameters marked as covariant or contravariant, using keywords out and in, respectively. These declarations are then respected for type conversions, both implicit and explicit, and both compile-time and run-time. For example, the existing interface  has been redefined as follows:
interface IEnumerable<out T>
{
    IEnumerator<T> GetEnumerator();
}

In practice, it makes it possible to write code such as:
void PrintAll(IEnumerable<object> objects)
{
    foreach (object o in objects)
    {
        System.Console.WriteLine(o);
    }
}

IEnumerable<string> strings = new List<string>();
PrintAll(strings); // IEnumerable<string> is implicitly converted to IEnumerable<object>

For contravariance, the existing interface  has been redefined as follows:
public interface IComparer<in T>
{
    int Compare(T x, T y);
}

It makes it possible to write code such as:
IComparer<object> objectComparer = GetComparer();
IComparer<string> stringComparer = objectComparer;

Enumerators
An enumerator is an iterator.
Enumerators are typically obtained by calling the  method of an object implementing the  interface. Container classes typically implement this interface. However, the foreach statement in C# can operate on any object providing such a method, even if it doesn't implement . This interface was expanded into generic version in .NET 2.0.

The following shows a simple use of iterators in C# 2.0:
// explicit version
IEnumerator<MyType> iter = list.GetEnumerator();
while (iter.MoveNext())
    Console.WriteLine(iter.Current);

// implicit version
foreach (MyType value in list)
    Console.WriteLine(value);

Generator functionality
This is a feature of C# 2.0.
The .NET 2.0 Framework allowed C# to introduce an iterator that provides generator functionality, using a  construct similar to yield in Python.
// Method that takes an iterable input (possibly an array)
// and returns all even numbers.
public static IEnumerable<int> GetEven(IEnumerable<int> numbers)
{
    foreach (int i in numbers)
    {
        if (i%2 == 0)
            yield return i;
    }
}

// using the method to output only even numbers from the array
static void Main()
{
    int[] numbers = { 1, 2, 3, 4, 5, 6};
    foreach (int i in GetEven(numbers))
        Console.WriteLine(i);  //outputs 2, 4 and 6
}

LINQ
This is a feature of C# 3.0 and .NET Framework 3.0.

LINQ, short for Language Integrated Queries, is a .NET Framework feature which simplifies the handling of data. Mainly it adds support that allows you to query arrays, collections, and databases. It also introduces binders, which makes it easier to access to databases and their data.

Query syntax
The LINQ query syntax was introduced in C# 3.0 and lets you write SQL-like queries in C#.
var list = new List<int>{ 2, 7, 1, 3, 9 };

var result = from i in list
             where i > 1
             select i;

The statements are compiled into method calls, whereby almost only the names of the methods are specified. Which methods are ultimately used is determined by normal overload resolution. Thus, the end result of the translation is affected by what symbols are in scope.

What differs from SQL is that the from-statement comes first and not last as in SQL. This is because it seems more natural writing like this in C#  and supports "Intellisense" (Code completion in the editor).

Anonymous methods
Anonymous methods, or in their present form more commonly referred to as "lambda expressions", is a feature which allows you to write inline closure-like functions in your code.

There are various ways to create anonymous methods. Prior to C# 3.0 there was limited support by using delegates.

Anonymous delegates
This is a feature of C# 2.0.

Anonymous delegates are functions pointers that hold anonymous methods. The purpose is to make it simpler to use delegates by simplifying the process of assigning the function. Instead of declaring a separate method in code the programmer can use the syntax to write the code inline and the compiler will then generate an anonymous function for it.
Func<int, int> f = delegate(int x) { return x * 2; };

Lambda expressions
This is a feature of C# 3.0.
Lambda expressions provide a simple syntax for inline functions that are similar to closures. Functions with parameters infer the type of the parameters if other is not explicitly specified.
// [arguments] => [method-body]

// With parameters
n => n == 2
(a, b) => a + b
(a, b) => { a++; return a + b; }

// With explicitly typed parameters
(int a, int b) => a + b

// No parameters
() => return 0

// Assigning lambda to delegate
Func<int, int, int> f = (a, b) => a + b;

Multi-statement lambdas have bodies enclosed by braces and inside of them code can be written like in standard methods.
(a, b) => { a++; return a + b; }

Lambda expressions can be passed as arguments directly in method calls similar to anonymous delegates but with a more aesthetic syntax.
var list = stringList.Where(n => n.Length > 2);

Lambda expressions are essentially compiler-generated methods that are passed via delegates. These methods are reserved for the compiler only and can not be used in any other context.

Extension methods
This is a feature of C# 3.0.

Extension methods are a form of syntactic sugar providing the illusion of adding new methods to the existing class outside its definition. In practice, an extension method is a static method that is callable as if it were an instance method; the receiver of the call is bound to the first parameter of the method, decorated with keyword this:
public static class StringExtensions
{
    public static string Left(this string s, int n)
    {
        return s.Substring(0, n);
    }
}

string s = "foo";
s.Left(3); // same as StringExtensions.Left(s, 3);

Local functions 
This is a feature of C# 7.0.

Local functions can be defined in the body of another method, constructor or property’s getter and setter. Such functions have access to all variables in the enclosing scope, including parent method local variables. They are in scope for the entire method, regardless of whether they’re invoked before or after their declaration. Access modifiers (public, private, protected) cannot be used with local functions. Also they do not support function overloading. It means there cannot be two local functions in the same method with the same name even if the signatures don’t overlap. After a compilation, a local function is transformed into a private static method, but when defined it cannot be marked static.

In code example below, the Sum method is a local function inside Main method. So it can be used only inside its parent method Main:
static void Main(string[] args)
{
    int Sum(int x, int y)
    {
        return x + y;
    }

    Console.WriteLine(Sum(10, 20));
    Console.ReadKey();
}

Miscellaneous

Closure blocks
C# implements closure blocks by means of the using statement. The using statement accepts an expression which results in an object implementing , and the compiler generates code that guarantees the object's disposal when the scope of the using-statement is exited. The using statement is syntactic sugar. It makes the code more readable than the equivalent  block.
public void Foo()
{
    using (var bar = File.Open("Foo.txt"))
    {
        // do some work
        throw new Exception();
        // bar will still get properly disposed.
    }
}

Thread synchronization
C# provides the lock statement, which is yet another example of beneficial syntactic sugar. It works by marking a block of code as a critical section by mutual exclusion of access to a provided object. Like the using statement, it works by the compiler generating a  block in its place.
private static StreamWriter _writer;

public void ConcurrentMethod()
{
    lock (_writer)
    {
        _writer.WriteLine("Line 1.");
        _writer.WriteLine("Followed by line 2.");
    }
}

Attributes
Attributes are entities of data that are stored as metadata in the compiled assembly. An attribute can be added to types and members like properties and methods. Attributes can be used for better maintenance of preprocessor directives.
[CompilerGenerated]
public class $AnonymousType$120
{
    [CompilerGenerated]
    public string Name { get; set; }
}

The .NET Framework comes with predefined attributes that can be used. Some of them serve an important role at runtime while some are just for syntactic decoration in code like . It does only mark that it is a compiler-generated element. Programmer-defined attributes can also be created.

An attribute is essentially a class which inherits from the  class. By convention, attribute classes end with "Attribute" in their name. This will not be required when using it.
public class EdibleAttribute : Attribute
{
    public EdibleAttribute() : base()
    {

    }

    public EdibleAttribute(bool isNotPoisonous)
    {
        this.IsPoisonous = !isNotPoisonous;
    }

    public bool IsPoisonous { get; set; }
}

Showing the attribute in use using the optional constructor parameters.
[Edible(true)]
public class Peach : Fruit
{
   // Members if any
}

Preprocessor
C# features "preprocessor directives" (though it does not have an actual preprocessor) based on the C preprocessor that allow programmers to define symbols, but not macros.

Directives such as  give hints to editors for code folding. The  block must be terminated with a  directive.
public class Foo
{
    #region Constructors
    public Foo() {}
    public Foo(int firstParam) {}
    #endregion

    #region Methods
    public void IntBar(int firstParam) {}
    public void StrBar(string firstParam) {}
    public void BoolBar(bool firstParam) {}
    #endregion
}

Code comments
C# utilizes a double slash to indicate the rest of the line is a comment.
public class Foo
{
    // a comment
    public static void Bar(int firstParam) {}  // Also a comment
}

Multi-line comments can be indicated by a starting slash/asterisk and ending asterisk/forward slash.
public class Foo
{
    /* A multi-line
       comment  */
    public static void Bar(int firstParam) {}
}

Comments do not nest. These are two single comments:
// Can put /* */ */ */ /* /*

/* Can put /* /* /* but it ends with */

Single-line comments beginning with three slashes are used for XML documentation. This, however, is a convention used by Visual Studio and is not part of the language definition:
    /// <summary>
    /// This class is very classy.
    /// </summary>

XML documentation system
C#'s documentation system is similar to Java's Javadoc, but based on XML. Two methods of documentation are currently supported by the C# compiler.

public class Foo
{
    /// <summary>A summary of the method.</summary>
    /// <param name="firstParam">A description of the parameter.</param>
    /// <remarks>Remarks about the method.</remarks>
    public static void Bar(int firstParam) {}
}

Multi-line documentation comments, while defined in the version 1.0 language specification, were not supported until the .NET 1.1 release. These comments are designated by a starting forward slash/asterisk/asterisk and ending asterisk/forward slash.
public class Foo
{
    /** <summary>A summary of the method.</summary>
     *  <param name="firstParam">A description of the parameter.</param>
     *  <remarks>Remarks about the method.</remarks> */
    public static void Bar(int firstParam) {}
}

There are some stringent criteria regarding white space and XML documentation when using the forward slash/asterisk/asterisk technique.

This code block:
/**
 * <summary>
 * A summary of the method.</summary>*/

produces a different XML comment than this code block:
/**
 * <summary>
   A summary of the method.</summary>*/

Syntax for documentation comments and their XML markup is defined in a non-normative annex of the ECMA C# standard. The same standard also defines rules for processing of such comments, and their transformation to a plain XML document with precise rules for mapping of Common Language Infrastructure (CLI) identifiers to their related documentation elements. This allows any C# integrated development environment (IDE) or other development tool to find documentation for any symbol in the code in a certain well-defined way.

Async-await syntax
This is a feature of C# 5.0 and .NET Framework 4.0.

As of .NET Framework 4 there is a task library that makes it easier to write parallel and multi-threaded applications through tasks.

C# 5.0 has native language support for asynchrony.

Consider this code that takes advantage of the task library directly:
public static class SomeAsyncCode
{
    public static Task<XDocument> GetContentAsync()
    {
        var httpClient = new HttpClient();
        return httpClient.GetStringAsync("https://www.contoso.com/").ContinueWith((task) => {
            string responseBodyAsText = task.Result;
            return XDocument.Parse(responseBodyAsText);
        });
    }
}

var t = SomeAsyncCode.GetContentAsync().ContinueWith((task) => {
    var xmlDocument = task.Result;
});

t.Start();

Here is the same logic written in the async-await syntax:
public static class SomeAsyncCode
{
    public static async Task<XDocument> GetContentAsync()
    {
        var httpClient = new HttpClient();
        string responseBodyAsText = await httpClient.GetStringAsync("https://www.contoso.com/");
        return XDocument.Parse(responseBodyAsText);
    }
}

var xmlDocument = await SomeAsyncCode.GetContentAsync();

// The Task will be started on call with await.

Dialects

Spec#
Spec# is a dialect of C# that is developed in parallel with the standard implementation from Microsoft. It extends C# with specification language features and is a possible future feature to the C# language. It also adds syntax for the code contracts API that was introduced in .NET Framework 4.0. Spec# is being developed by Microsoft Research.

This sample shows two of the basic structures that are used when adding contracts to your code.
static void Main(string![] args)
    requires args.Length > 0
{
    foreach (string arg in args)
    {

    }
}

  is used to make a reference type non-nullable, e.g. you cannot set the value to null. This in contrast of nullable types which allow value types to be set as null.
  indicates a condition that must be followed in the code. In this case the length of args is not allowed to be zero or less.

Non-nullable types
Spec# extends C# with non-nullable types that simply checks so the variables of nullable types that has been set as non-nullable are not null. If is null then an exception will be thrown.
   string! input

In use:
public Test(string! input)
{
    ...
}

Preconditions
Preconditions are checked before a method is executed.
public Test(int i)
    requires i > 0;
{
    this.i = i;
}

Postconditions
Postconditions are conditions that are ensured to be correct when a method has been executed.
public void Increment()
    ensures i > 0;
{
    i++;
}

Checked exceptions
Spec# adds checked exceptions like those in Java.
public void DoSomething()
    throws SomeException; // SomeException : ICheckedException
{
    ...
}

Checked exceptions are problematic, because when a lower-level function adds a new exception type, the whole chain of methods using this method at some nested lower level must also change its contract. This violates the open/closed principle.

See also
 .NET Framework
 C# (programming language)
 Mono (software)
 Microsoft Visual C#

References

Bart de Smet on Spec#

External links
Microsoft .NET Framework
Mono project

C Sharp programming language family
Programming language syntax